is a 2020 Japanese superhero film that serves as the film adaptation and epilogue for the 2019–2020 Japanese television series Kamen Rider Zero-One.
It was released in Japan on December 18, 2020 in a double billing with Kamen Rider Saber Theatrical Short Story: The Phoenix Swordsman and the Book of Ruin.

Plot
"If God created this world in 6 days, then I will destroy it in 60 minutes, and create a paradise." Suddenly, a mysterious man named Es / Kamen Rider Eden, accompanied by thousands of believers, appears. Meanwhile, several large-scale terrorist attacks take place worldwide simultaneously. As people one after another fall and the world is in turmoil, Aruto Hiden stands up to stop Es while Isamu Fuwa, Yua Yaiba, Gai Amatsu, Jin, and Horobi struggle to learn the truth. What is the true identity of Es, who shows incredible strength? What does the paradise he is trying to create mean?

Cast

: 
: 
, : 
: 
: 
: 
: 
: 
: 
: 
: 
: 
: 
: 
: 
: 
: 
: 
: 
: 
Mua's true identity: 
Buga's true identity: 
Announcer Humagear: 
: 
: 
Old couple: , 
Followers: , 
: 
: 
: 
: 
A.I. news voice: 
News presenters (Voice): , Victor Isurugi, Jessica Gerrity, Marsita Kogure, Ryan Bryneison
Narration:

Production
The script was written in February 2020, and it takes place after the final episode of the television series. Originally, it depicted an incident that happened within 60 minutes during the finale, but due to being filmed during the Covid-19 state of emergency and the change in release date, it was changed to take place 3 months after the finale. The appearance of a new Is, Ark-One’s early appearance being changed to As and other details were altered. Because of this, Ikazuchi and Naki which were originally not planned to appear were added to the film.

Most of Es’s character speeches and roles in the story were derived from the Old Testament. 

The scenes in Hiden Intelligence office were shot before the series finale as the set was scheduled to be dismantled after filming was finished.

Suit Design
The movie-exclusive form for Kamen Rider Zero-One "Hellrising Hopper" was created from repainting the "Shining Assault Hopper" suit that was used in the series itself. The CGI grasshopper that appeared when the character transforms reuses the model that was created for Kamen Rider Zero-Two's transformation. 

Kamen Rider Lucifer was a last-minute addition created by repainting the suit used for Kamen Rider Eden.

Theme song
"A.I. ∴ All Imagination"
Lyrics: Endcape
Composition: J
Arrangement: J×Takanori Nishikawa, DJ'Tekina//Something
Artist: J×Takanori Nishikawa

Reception

Kamen Rider Zero-One the Movie: Real×Time grossed $2,611,150 at the box office.

Home video release
Shout! Factory released the film and Kamen Rider Zero-One on Blu-ray and digital on January 22, 2022 in the North America.

References

External links
 

2020s Kamen Rider films
Kamen Rider Zero-One